The London Underground E Stock were steel-bodied cars built for the London Underground in 1914 by the Gloucester Railway Carriage and Wagon Company.

Thirty cars were built, twenty-six driving motor cars and four trailers. The E stock was based on the earlier C Stock and D Stock but differed in that the roof was elliptical rather than the clerestory roof of the C Stock and D Stock.

In the 1940s the C, D and E stocks were reclassified as "H Stock" (signifying hand-operated doors), along with other pre-1938 District Line rolling stock that had not been converted to have air-operated doors. The H Stock was largely eliminated by the early 1950s, following replacement by R Stock. The remaining cars were largely confined to the Olympia shuttle service. While the last example was withdrawn from passenger service in 1958, one motor car was used as a "Stores Carrier" car No. SC636, painted in the then-current LT service stock grey livery and fitted with side buffers and a screw link coupling at the cab end.  SC636 was observed in use in the summer of 1960 but had been withdrawn by February 1962. No E Stock car has been preserved.

They were generally similar in appearance to the B Stock, except that the E Stock had an elliptical roof.

References

Metropolitan District Railway
E
Train-related introductions in 1914